Mixed-sex sports (also known as mixed-gender or coed sports) are individual and team sports whose participants are not of a single sex.  In organised sports settings, rules usually dictate an equal number of people of each sex in a team (for example teams of one man and one woman). Usually, the main purpose of these rules are to account for physiological sex differences. Mixed-sex sports in informal settings are typically groups of neighbours, friends or family playing without regard to the sex of the participants. Mixed-sex play is also common in children's sports as before puberty and adolescence, sport-relevant sex differences affect performance far less.

There are multiple dynamics to mixed-sex sports. Where sex differences in human physiology do not play a significant role in a person's proficiency in a sport, then men and women may compete in a single open class, as in equestrian sports. When sex is a major factor in a competitor's performance, sports will typically split men and women into separate divisions, but there may be mixed-sex team variants, such as mixed doubles. In artistic judged sports, these physical differences play a key role in performances, as demonstrated in pair figure skating and acrobatic gymnastics.

Mixed-sex sport events may be organised to achieve certain social aims, such as boosting female participation in sport, as a form of exercise, or to improve social harmony between the sexes.

Direct competition
It is uncommon in most organised sports to find individuals of different genders competing head-to-head at elite levels, principally due to physiological differences between the (adult) sexes. In sports where these differences are less linked to performance, it is standard practice for men and women to compete in mixed-sex fields. These open-class sports prove accommodating to intersex athletes, who challenge sex-defined rules of both single-sex events and mixed-sex teams with distinct male and female composition.

In equestrian sports, male and female riders compete against each other in eventing, dressage and show jumping disciplines. Female jockeys compete alongside male ones in horse racing, though they constitute a minority of jockeys overall. Beyond the human athletes, male and female horses are found in racing, with a roughly 60/40 split at the top level between colts and fillies.

In snooker, the professional tour is open to men and women, although only one woman has to date competed on the tour for a full year (other women have played in individual tournaments). In addition, the separate women-only tour encourages female participation in the sport.

In croquet, three women have won the British Association Croquet Open Championship: Lily Gower in 1905, Dorothy Steel in 1925, 1933, 1935 and 1936, and Hope Rotherham in 1960. In 2018, two international Golf Croquet championships open to both sexes were won by women: Rachel Gee of England beat Pierre Beaudry to win the European Golf Croquet championship, and Hanan Rashad of Egypt beat Yasser Fathy (also from Egypt) to win the World over-50s championship.

The mixed division is a staple of Ultimate (without being the standard)—it is the only division showcased at both the 2013 and 2017 World Games. Seven-player mixed teams (4 men plus 3 women, or 4 women plus 3 men) directly compete. While most often players mark opponents of the same gender, match-ups between people of different gender are not uncommon to see. Open divisions are common in Ultimate, where sex/gender is not explicitly relevant in team composition—although at highest competitive levels male players predominate these divisions. Accordingly, although women's divisions are also common, men's are not (only appearing in settings without open divisions).

In sport shooting, the physical demands are lower relative to other sports, though fatigue and grip may be different between sexes. Research is conflicting about the influence of sex in the performance of shooters.
In 1966 the International Shooting Sport Federation published its open events as mixed. From 1968 to 1980, men and women competed together in Olympic shooting.

In the NCAA, the main governing body of college/university sports in the US, the only sport in which men and women compete against one another directly is rifle shooting. While male and female riders compete against one another in international equestrian sports, NCAA-recognized competition is open only to women, currently as part of the NCAA Emerging Sports for Women program. The NCAA awards a combined men's and women's team championship in two sports—fencing and skiing—but all individual bouts or races involve members of the same sex, and teams field separate men's and women's squads.

In dog sled racing, male and female mushers are in direct competition. About 1/3rd of mushers in the Iditarod are female, and finishers in the top ten are proportionately split by gender.

In most forms of motorsport, men and women are allowed to compete in direct competition. There are some series which are female only in an effort to promote women in motorsport, most notably W Series and Formula Women. However, these series have caught criticism for segregating female drivers as opposed to supporting them in their own campaigns.

Mixed doubles or pairs

A common form of mixed-sex event is for pairs of one male and one female.

Sports based on dancing usually have male/female pairings, such as ice dancing, pair figure skating, ballroom dancing and synchronised swimming duets. In these sports/events, the male and female participants physically work together (often to music) to jointly produce an artistic athletic performance. Similarly, taekwondo poomsae, which is performance-based, also has a mixed pair event.

Mixed doubles are events where two mixed-sex pairs directly compete (that is, all four competitors are in open play as two teams). This is particularly found in racket sports (which rarely have larger teams), including tennis, table tennis, badminton, squash and racquetball.

Pairs may also compete in turn-based games: one format (out of many) alternates the woman and man of each pair just as the competing sides alternate, so each round has four turns of individual action. Well-suited to strategy-based sports (such as mixed doubles curling, mixed golf, mixed bowling, mixed team darts) where players can beneficially undertake mental planning or assessment while waiting for their turn. Separate male and female performances may also be scored then added to produce mixed team results in such sports as diving. Synchronised diving is also found in mixed-sex format. In professional wrestling, mixed tag team matches do not explicitly alternate in a turn-based manner but each wrestler only faces their opponent of the same sex (switching occurs at players' discretion). Intergender wrestling between a man and a woman also occurs but is scripted like other professional wrestling.

Mixed relay
In non-vehicular racing sports the physiological differences between the sexes often preclude head-to-head competition between people of different sexes at the elite level. Mixed-sex events are often held though with a relay race format.

In running, a 4 × 400 m mixed relay race was introduced at the 2017 IAAF World Relays, and added to the 2019 World Athletics Championships (details) and 2020 Summer Olympics (details). In addition, a 2 × 2 × 400 m and shuttle hurdles mixed relay races were introduced at the 2019 IAAF World Relays. The Match Europe v USA in 2019 had a mixed 200+200+400+800 m sprint medley relay.

In cross country running, a 4 × 2 km mixed relay race was added at the 2017 IAAF World Cross Country Championships.

In swimming, mixed relay races were introduced at the 2014 FINA World Swimming Championships (25 m) (4 × 50 m freestyle and medley), the 2015 World Aquatics Championships (4 × 100 m freestyle and medley), and the 2020 Summer Olympics (4 × 100 m medley). In open water swimming, mixed-gendered relays were introduced at the 2011 World Aquatics Championships (4 × 1250 m).

In triathlon, the ITU Triathlon Mixed Relay World Championships mixed relay race has been held since 2009. Also, the triathlon at the Youth Olympic Games has a mixed relay race since 2010, and the event was introduced at the 2020 Summer Olympics (details). As in standard triathlons, each triathlon competitor must do a segment of swimming, cycling and running.

In biathlon, a mixed relay race was first held at the Biathlon World Championships 2005 in Khanty-Mansiysk (4 × 6 km), and it was added to the 2014 Winter Olympics (4 × 6 km / 7.5 km).

In road cycling, the 2019 UCI Road World Championships introduced a team time trial mixed relay where first three men and then three women ride together as a national team. Distances vary in road cycling. The 2019 race was 2 × 14 km.

In mountain biking, the UCI Mountain Bike World Championships has a mixed team relay race since 1999.

Mixed team ball sports
Mixed-sex forms of ball sports involve set numbers of each sex per team, sometimes defining the roles in the team by sex/gender (examples include korfball, Baseball5, coed softball, quidditch, dodgeball, touch/tag rugby, wheelchair handball, and wheelchair rugby, wheelchair rugby league, and Netball).

Mixed team sports
In adventure racing teams of 4 must include at least 1 member of the opposite sex. Archery also incorporates mixed-team competition (which can also be seen at the Olympic level).

In a number of countries, club underwater hockey is mixed-sex with any ratio of sex allowed. However, national teams usually compete in single sex teams.

Olympics

Ancient 
Sports were almost never mixed in any way in ancient Greece. Women were forbidden from competing in or viewing the ancient Olympic games. They competed at the separate Heraean games, from which men were excluded. Although taking place in the same stadium as the Olympic games and also every four years, it was an unrelated festival (of Hera) with fewer sport events, none of which exactly matched Olympic counterparts. Olympic winners were honoured in the Sanctuary of Zeus; Heraean winners at the Temple of Hera (where since 1936 the modern movement has lit and kept the Olympic Flame).

Modern 

Mixed-sex sport has a long history at the modern Olympic Games, dating back to the 1900 Summer Olympics (the first in which women participated). Two women competed against men in equestrian events, the croquet competition was mixed-sex, and Hélène de Pourtalès was the sole female sailor, achieving the Olympics′ first mixed-sex team champion as part of the gold medal-winning Swiss team. The sole time Olympic motorboating was held (1908), Sophia Gorham took part in a mixed British team.

Mixed doubles tennis was first contested in 1900 but fell off the programme after 1924 before being reintroduced in 2012. Mixed doubles badminton was introduced in 1996.

Pair figure skating was present at the summer games in 1908 and 1920 before continuing as a founding event at the first Winter Olympic Games. Ice dancing expanded the mixed figure skating programme in 1976.

Sailing at the Summer Olympics was mostly mixed-sex up to 1988 but grew increasingly divided, with no mixed sailing events being held in 2012. Similarly, shooting at the Summer Olympics continued on a mixed basis in several events from 1968 to 1992, before competitors were restricted by sex.

There was an increased focus on mixed-sex competition at the start of the 21st century, with new introductions including mixed biathlon relay, team figure skating, and luge mixed team relay in 2014, then Nacra 17 in 2016, and mixed doubles curling and mixed team alpine skiing in 2018. Mixed team shooting events and table tennis mixed doubles are set for inauguration at the 2020 Summer Olympics. Mixed-sex relay events are also slated for the 2020 athletics and swimming programmes. These changes resulted from an International Olympic Committee initiative to increase women's participation towards parity with men's – the recasting of men's events as mixed-sex ones was a part of this initiative.

Baseball5 will be played at the 2026 Summer Youth Olympics, and will be the first Olympic team sport involving mixed-sex teams.

See also
 Battle of the Sexes (tennis)
 Mixed-sex education
 Women's sports
 Women's professional sports

Notes

References

External links
Could high school sports be coed?

 
Gender and sport
Sports by type